The Sir Frank Worrell Cricket Ground (formerly known as the University of the West Indies Ground) is a cricket ground in Kingston, Jamaica.

History
The ground is located on the campus of the University of the West Indies at Mona in Kingston, which was established in 1948. The cricket ground at the campus was originally known as the University of the West Indies Ground, but was later renamed in honour of Frank Worrell. Under the influence of the university's Pro Vice-Chancellor, Professor Hilary Beckles, a University of the West Indies cricket team was invited to take part in the 2002–03 and 2003–04 editions of the Red Stripe Bowl, with the ground at Kingston playing host to the side for one List A one-day match in the 2002–03 edition against the Rest of Leeward Islands, while in the 2003–04 edition the ground played host to the Rest of Leeward Islands against Trinidad and Tobago. In March 2004, the ground played host to a first-class match between the University of the West Indies Vice Chancellor's XI and a touring England XI, which the England XI won by an innings and 85 runs.

Records

List A
Highest team total: 203 for 6 (50 overs) by Rest of Leeward Islands v Trinidad and Tobago, 2003–04
Lowest team total: 140 all out (49.3 overs) by University of the West Indies v Rest of Leeward Islands, 2002–03
Highest individual innings: 63 not out by Alex Adams for Rest of Leeward Islands v University of the West Indies, 2002–03
Best bowling in an innings: 3-15 by Omari Banks for Rest of Leeward Islands v University of the West Indies, as above

See also
List of cricket grounds in the West Indies

References

External links
Sir Frank Worrell Cricket Ground at ESPNcricinfo

Cricket grounds in Jamaica
University of the West Indies